Census Division No. 20 (Swan River) is a census division located within the Parkland Region of the province of Manitoba. Unlike in some other provinces, census divisions do not reflect the organization of local government in Manitoba. These areas exist solely for the purposes of statistical analysis and presentation; they have no government of their own.

The population of the division in the 2006 census was 10,405. The economic bases of the region is mixed grain, livestock and forestry. It also includes all of Duck Mountain Provincial Park.

Demographics 

Towns
 Swan River

Unincorporated communities

 Benito
 Bowsman
 Minitonas

Municipalities

Minitonas – Bowsman
Mountain
Swan Valley West

First Nations

 Wuskwi Sipihk First Nation

Unorganized areas
 Unorganized North Division No. 20
 Unorganized South Division No. 20

References

External links
 Manitoba Community Profiles: Swan River

20